Evan Chen (born June 3, 1996) is a Taiwanese-American mathematician at the Massachusetts Institute of Technology who is active in mathematical competitions. He is best known for Euclidean Geometry in Mathematical Olympiads, a textbook commonly used by contestants training for international math competitions which he wrote during high school, as well as the Napkin textbook.

Education and competitions

While attending Irvington High School, Chen attended undergraduate and graduate classes at the University of California, Berkeley from 2012 to 2014. During this time, he attended the Mathematical Olympiad Program and the Research Science Institute held at MIT.

In his final year of high school, Chen went on to win a gold medal at the International Math Olympiad for Taiwan, as well as a $12,500 scholarship for finishing second in the United States of America Mathematical Olympiad. Later on he would also place in the Putnam competition, athough he was never a Putnam Fellow.

Leadership roles in mathematics competitions 

Chen has accompanied the United States teams to several international competitions together with Po-Shen Loh; he has traveled as an observer to the International Math Olympiad and was also the deputy leader for the American team at the Romanian Masters of Mathematics. 

Chen is also the current assistant academic director of the Mathematical Olympiad Program and designs the team selection tests, and runs his own training program during the school year named OTIS.

Mathematical research

As an undergraduate, Chen attended REU programs organized by Joseph Gallian and Ken Ono. Under their supervision, he published four joint papers and five sole-author papers in number theory and combinatorics which were published in journals such as the Proceedings of the American Mathematical Society, Electronic Journal of Combinatorics, Research in Number Theory, and the International Journal of Number Theory.

In 2019 Chen was awarded an honorable mention for the Morgan Prize for his work.

External links

 Personal website
 arXiv publication listing

References

1996 births
21st-century American mathematicians
Massachusetts Institute of Technology alumni
International Mathematical Olympiad participants
Living people
People from Fremont, California